````

Georg Buschner (26 December 1925 – 12 February 2007) was an East German football player and manager.

Buschner played in the East German top-flight for Motor Gera and Motor Jena. He earned six caps for the East Germany national football team between 1954 and 1957, and later coached the team from 1970 to 1981. He was a Stasi informer under the codename "Georg" from 1966 to 1971. He was the coach when East Germany played in their only World Cup appearance in 1974, and produced one of their most famous victories upset by beating West Germany in the first round. He also led East Germany to the bronze medal at the 1972 Olympics and the gold medal in the 1976 Olympics.

He died on 12 February 2007 of prostate cancer.

External links

References

1925 births
2007 deaths
Sportspeople from Gera
East German footballers
1974 FIFA World Cup managers
German football managers
East German football managers
FC Carl Zeiss Jena managers
East Germany national football team managers
German footballers
FC Carl Zeiss Jena players
Deaths from prostate cancer
East Germany international footballers
Deaths from cancer in Germany
Footballers from Thuringia
Association football defenders
People of the Stasi